Poeni refers to:

 Poenit – terms given by near eastern civilizations for Phoenicia or the land of Punt
 Poeni, Teleorman – Teleorman County, Romania